Robert McFarlane (born 1942) is an Australian photographer and photographic critic.

Early life
Born in Adelaide, South Australia in 1942, he was given a Kodak Box Brownie at the age of 9 by his parents, Bill and Poppy McFarlane. Five years later, while at Brighton High School (today known as Brighton Secondary School) in Adelaide's southern suburbs, he used a recently purchased Durst medium format rangefinder camera to capture an image of a teacher striking a pupil at the school assembly. 

Though talented in English and History, McFarlane was an undistinguished student and left school at 16, finding work as a trainee electric welder. He was deeply influenced , however, by the traveling documentary photography exhibition The Family of Man, which reached Adelaide in 1959.

Career
Encouraged by his employers during a brief stint as a copy boy in an advertising agency, he began to work more seriously as a photojournalist, gaining a commission from Walkabout to photograph Professor John Bishop, co-founder of the Adelaide Festival of Arts. On the same assignment he also made images of author Patrick White, dancer and choreographer Sir Robert Helpmann, actor John Bell and painter Sidney Nolan. 

In 1963, McFarlane moved to Sydney, working for The Bulletin and Australian Vogue. With the artist Kate Burness, who became his first wife, he travelled to London in 1969, where he freelanced for The Daily Telegraph, The Sunday Times Magazine, and NOVA magazine. He returned to Sydney in 1973 and eventually to Adelaide in 2007. McFarlane later remarried to the theatre director Mary-Ann Vale and has two children, Morgan (1974–1994, born to Kate Burness) and Billy (born 1990, to Mary-Ann Vale).

Though McFarlane specializes in social issues – he is currently working on a book documenting mental illness – and performance, he has also taken portraits of a number of notable figures in Australian and international life. These include fellow photographers W Eugene Smith, Don McCullin, Jeff Carter, Max Dupain, David Moore, Trent Parke and Stephen Dupont; political figures such as Bob Hawke, Gough Whitlam, Charlie Perkins and Pauline Hanson; renowned surgeon Sir Edward "Weary" Dunlop; jazz violinist Stéphane Grappelli; boxer Henry Cooper; and Atlantic Records co-founder Ahmet Ertegun. His theatrical work has seen him cover a number of plays featuring Steven Berkoff, and he photographed the early performances of Geoffrey Rush, Cate Blanchett and Robyn Archer. McFarlane has also worked as a stills photographer for film directors such as Bruce Beresford, John Duigan, Gillian Armstrong, Esben Storm, Phillip Noyce, and PJ Hogan. 

In 1985, in the lead up to the 1988 bicentenary of Australia's European settlement, McFarlane was among 21 photographers chosen to live and work in remote Aboriginal communities in a project that became known as After 200 Years: Photographic Essays of Aboriginal And Islander Australia Today. It remains the largest single photographic project in Australian history, and was published both as a touring exhibition and a book.

McFarlane's work is held in the permanent collections of the National Portrait Gallery (Canberra), the National Gallery of Australia, the Art Gallery of New South Wales, the Art Gallery of South Australia and the National Library of Australia. His most prominent recent exhibition is Received Moments, a 48-year career retrospective, which began touring Australia in December 2009 and concluded in Adelaide in late 2011. McFarlane was a significant contributor to Candid Camera: Australian Photography 1950s–1970s at the Art Gallery of South Australia (May to August 2010) which also featured the work of key Australian photographers Max Dupain, David Moore, Jeff Carter, Mervyn Bishop, Rennie Ellis, Carol Jerrems and Roger Scott.

McFarlane has written extensively about photography for a number of Australian publications, and was photographic critic for the Sydney Morning Herald for more than 25 years. He currently writes and maintains a website called OzPhotoReview, a blog focusing primarily on fine art and documentary photography in Australia while also discussing technical developments.

The Received Moment
Though McFarlane has not written extensively on the subject himself, his idea of the "received moment" has attracted media and curatorial attention. Related in some ways to Henri Cartier-Bresson's "decisive moment", McFarlane's formulation is seen as being "gentler, more contemplative". By suggesting the need for the photographer to remain open to the world around, it also has the advantage of containing the seed of a photographic method. Gael Newton, senior curator of photography at the National Gallery of Australia, has written about McFarlane's approach and quotes him as saying "I see making pictures as a receiving of the image. Where you stand, both physically and emotionally, decrees the kind of picture you, through your camera, will receive".

Awards
In 2017 he won the Jim Bettison and Helen James Award, awarded by the Adelaide Film Festival in collaboration with the Bettison and James Foundation.

References
Notes

Sources
 McFarlane, Robert "Robert McFarlane Photos" website
 Newton, Gael "Robert McFarlane – Celebrated Australian Photographer", page 69, Antiques & Art in NSW, May–September 2009
 Newton, Gael "Robert McFarlane, Received Moments: Photography 1961–2009", Manly Art Gallery & Museum catalog essay
 Newton, Gael "Shades of Light: Photography and Australia 1839–1988", 1988 Australian National Gallery
 Robinson, Julie "Candid Camera: Australian Photography 1950s–1970s" Art Gallery of South Australia exhibition booklet

External links
 Robert McFarlane Photos
  OzPhotoReview
 Josef Lebovic Gallery

Photographers from Adelaide
Australian photographers
Living people
1942 births
Photography critics